I Am Who I Am may refer to:

Literature
 Modern English Bible versions' rendering of "I Am that I Am", is the name God gives Moses when he confronts the burning bush in Exodus 3:13–15
 I Am Who I Am, a 1978 play about Anna Anderson, written by Royce Ryton

Music

Albums
 Sou quem Sou (I am who I am), a 1969 album by soccer player Armando Costa
 I Am Who I Am, a 2012 mixtape by Maino
 I Am Who I Am (album), a 2015 Country music record by former NHL hockey player Theo Fleury

Songs
 "I Am Who I Am" (Lara Fabian song), 2000
 "I Am Who I Am/Secret Love", a 2010 single by Lee Ryan
 "I Am Who I Am", a 2010 song from The Books album The Way Out
 "I Am Who I Am", a 2012 song from the Running Wild album Shadowmaker
 "I Am Who I Am", a 2013 song by Marta Ritova, a Latvian participant of the Eurovision Song Contest 2013

See also
 I Am What I Am (disambiguation)